Bakary Coulibaly (born 11 April 1984) is a retired Malian football striker.

References

1984 births
Living people
People from Bamako
Malian footballers
Mali international footballers
Djoliba AC players
Stade Malien players
Al Masry SC players
El Entag El Harby SC players
CS Duguwolofila players
Association football forwards
Malian expatriate footballers
Expatriate footballers in Egypt
Malian expatriate sportspeople in Egypt
21st-century Malian people